Melissa is the debut studio album by Danish heavy metal band Mercyful Fate, released on 30 October 1983. It was the first album released by Roadrunner Records. This was also the first Mercyful Fate effort to get an official release in the United States through Megaforce Records, as the self-titled EP was a highly sought after import, and the BBC sessions were only available on bootleg tapes. Melissa has been identified as one of the earliest examples of extreme metal, and is often considered to be a major influence on the then-developing thrash metal, black metal and death metal genres.

In 2005, Roadrunner Records re-released this album with several bonus tracks and a bonus DVD. Music is credited to Hank Shermann and lyrics to King Diamond.

Content and music
Some of the material on the album had its roots in demos recorded when the musicians were members of the underground bands Black Rose and Brats: "Curse of the Pharaohs", which was originally titled "Night Riders" on an old Brats demo, was retitled after King Diamond changed the lyrics originally written by the Brats bassist; "Love Criminals", actually the first song Mercyful Fate ever wrote, was renamed "Into the Coven", which was originally meant to be the title of the album too. The album also contains "Satan's Fall" which, as Michael Denner recalls, took ages to learn and elicited an eerie feeling the few times he heard it. Hank Shermann wrote the music for this song, which was composed during many sleepless nights on his unplugged guitar in his living room. The band kept rehearsing the song for a long time in its unfinished form, as Shermann continuously added new parts. According to Denner, there are about sixteen different riffs in "Satan's Fall", which was the band's longest song with a running time over 11 minutes, until the band released Dead Again, on which the title track is 13 minutes long.

Recording
On 18 July 1983, Mercyful Fate started recording at Easy Sounds Studios in Copenhagen with producer Henrik Lund, who was the co-owner of the studio along with his brother. The band spent 12 days in the studio to record and mix the album. The songs had been thoroughly arranged and rehearsed in advance to make the most of the limited time. Lund, who had never produced a metal band before, mixed the album on his own, but accepted comments from the musicians on his different takes. The band found this procedure very irritating but, in retrospect, Diamond understands "that he didn't want a bunch of amateurs hanging over his shoulder." At that time, the label asked the band to do a cover song, so the band recorded Led Zeppelin's "Immigrant Song". The band skipped it because they felt it did not fit very well with the lyrics and feel of the album. According to Shermann, Diamond's performance was very surprising, because he sounded very close to Robert Plant's original vocals.

Release
In December 1983, the "Black Funeral" single was released. It contained on the B-side the song "Black Masses", which was recorded during the Melissa sessions, but had been deleted from the album. It was the first song recorded in the initial session and the sound was not completely satisfying, so the track was reduced to a B-side only.

Touring
On 3 December 1983, Mercyful Fate were booked to support Ozzy Osbourne in Copenhagen, but due to an illness on Osbourne's part, the show was canceled. Later that same month, the band performed a headline show in Copenhagen as preparation for their upcoming European tour.

The European tour started in the Netherlands on 19 January 1984 at The Dynamo, in Eindhoven. The next day, they performed a set at The Countdown Cafe in Hilversum, which was broadcast live on Dutch national radio. On 21 January, they performed in Amsterdam, at The Paradiso Theatre, where the skull of Melissa was stolen from the altar on stage by a fan due to very incompetent local security. Then the band went touring Italy on February, where they performed 6 shows, and on the following 3 March, they started their UK tour supporting Manowar. Originally, 11 shows were booked, but it turned out that Mercyful Fate would only play one. That first and only show took place at St. Albans City Hall in Hertfordshire, where the main act crew did not leave Mercyful Fate time for a sound check and for properly set up their equipment. Manowar's sound engineer even tampered with Mercyful Fate's soundboard during their performance, which was reduced from 45 minutes to 25. Manowar refused to comply to Mercyful Fate and Roadrunner's request for better treatment, which forced the band to leave the tour with great financial loss to themselves, not to mention disappointment of their British fans.

On 5 April, the band played a sold-out headline show at Saltlageret, in Copenhagen. There, for the first time, they were able to present their new chapel stage set. Then on 30 April, they began to work on the next release for the next 19 days, once again at Easy Sounds Studios. On 10 June, the band performed at the prestigious Heavy Sounds Festival in Poperinge, Belgium. Beside Mercyful Fate, the bill also featured Motörhead, Twisted Sister, Metallica, Barón Rojo, Lita Ford, H-Bomb and Faithful Breath.

Additional information
In 1985, advocating the need for Parental Advisory labels on audio recordings, the Parents Music Resource Center cited "Into the Coven" among their Filthy Fifteen objectionable songs due to its perceived occult content.

It was in 1984 that Mercyful Fate first met the members of Metallica, whom they've stayed very good friends with since then. It all began when Metallica, while recording in Copenhagen, borrowed amplifiers from Mercyful Fate and various other equipment.

A re-recorded version of "Evil" is featured in the video game Guitar Hero: Metallica.

In 2017, Rolling Stone ranked Melissa as 17th on their list of 'The 100 Greatest Metal Albums of All Time'.

Track listing

25th anniversary edition DVD track listing
Live at Dynamo, Eindhoven, Holland 1983
"Doomed by the Living Dead"
"Black Funeral"
"Curse of the Pharaohs"

Personnel

Mercyful Fate
King Diamond – vocals
Hank Shermann – guitar
Michael Denner – guitar (tracks 1–11)
Timi Hansen – bass
Kim Ruzz – drums

Additional performers
Benny Petersen – guitar (tracks 12–13)

Production
Produced by Henrik Lund
Engineered by Jacob J. Jorgensen
Mixed by Henrik Lund and Mercyful Fate
Tracks 9–11 produced and mixed by Tony Wilson and engineered by David Dade
Tracks 12–13 produced by Mercyful Fate
Cover art by Thomas Holm / Studio Dzyan
Photography by Thomas Grondahl

2005 reissue
Produced for reissue by Tom Burleigh and Monte Conner, assisted by Steven Hartong
Remastered by Ted Jensen
Liner notes written by Don Kaye
Art direction by Mr. Scott Design
Additional photography by Kevin Estrada
DVD authoring by James Moore / Moore Imagination

Charts

References

Mercyful Fate albums
1983 debut albums
Roadrunner Records albums